In knitting, a bobble is a localized set of stitches forming a raised bump.  The bumps are usually arranged in a regular geometrical pattern (e.g., a hexagonal grid) or may be figurative, e.g., represent apples on a knitted tree.

The basic idea of a bobble is to increase into a single stitch, knit a few short rows, then decrease back to a single stitch.  However, this leaves many choices: how to increase and how many stitches, how many short rows to work, and how to decrease.

A bobble can also be a yarn pom-pom used to decorate knitted items such as bobble hats.

References
 (2002) Vogue Knitting: The Ultimate Knitting Book, updated ed., Sixth and Spring Books. 
 (1979) Reader's Digest Complete Guide to Needlework, Reader's Digest Association.  
 June Hemmons Hiatt (2012) The Principles of Knitting, Simon and Schuster, pp. 228–231.  

Knitting